Yadana Cave Festival is an annual festival held in Amarapura, Burma  . The festival celebrates celestial beings. The locals typically wear bamboo hats and hold prayer flowers during the festival.

References

Festivals in Myanmar
Amarapura